The PalmettoPride Classic was a golf tournament on the Nationwide Tour. It was only played in 2006. It was played at the Daniel Island Club in Charleston, South Carolina, United States.

The purse was $500,000, with $90,000 going to the winner.

Winners

Both Sim and Duke graduated to the PGA Tour via the final Nationwide Tour money list.

External links
PGATOUR.com tournament site

Former Korn Ferry Tour events
Golf in South Carolina
Sports in Charleston, South Carolina
Sports competitions in South Carolina
Events in Charleston, South Carolina